SS Southwark was an American Ocean liner that was built by William Denny and Brothers for the American Line.

Service History
As she was launched in 1893, she was initially sailed on American Line's transatlantic route from Liverpool, via Queenstown, to Philadelphia. In 1895, Southwark was sold to the Red Star Line which employed her on the Antwerp to New York route. In 1903 she was sold to the Dominion Line for the Liverpool to Canada route. She was subsequently sold to the Allan line before being scrapped in 1911.

Her sister ship was SS Kensington.

References

1893 ships
Merchant ships of the United States
Passenger ships of the United States